Cymindis lineola is a species of ground beetle in the subfamily Harpalinae. It was described by L. Dufour in 1820.

References

lineola
Beetles described in 1820